Christel Agrikola (born 29 March 1953) is a German rower. She competed in the women's single sculls event at the 1976 Summer Olympics.

References

External links
 

1953 births
Living people
German female rowers
Olympic rowers of West Germany
Rowers at the 1976 Summer Olympics
People from Germersheim
Sportspeople from Rhineland-Palatinate